Ruth Osborne (1680–1751) was an English woman who was accused of being a witch.

Alleged witchcraft
At the time of the rebellion in 1745, Osborne went to a farmer by the name of Butterfield, who kept a dairy at Gubblecut, near Tring, in Hertfordshire, and begged for some buttermilk. Butterfield, by a brutal refusal, angered the old woman, who went away muttering that the Pretender would pay him out. In the course of the next year or so a number of the farmer's calves became distempered, and he himself contracted epileptic fits. In the meantime he gave up dairy-farming and took a public-house, The wiseacres who met there attributed his misfortunes to witchcraft, and advised Butterfield to apply to a cunning woman or white witch for a cure. An old woman was fetched from Northamptonshire, and confirmed the suspicion already entertained against Ruth Osborne and her husband John, both harmless old people over seventy years of age.

Ducking
After some ineffectual measures, recourse was had to on expedient which should at the same time deter the Osbornes from their alleged malpractices and benefit Butterfield and the neighbouring publicans. Notice was given by the crier at the adjoining towns of Winslow, Hemel Hempstead, and Leighton Buzzard, that witches were to be tried by ducking at Longmarstone on 22 April 1751.

A large and determined mob mustered at Tring on the day specified, and forced the parish overseer and master of the workhouse by threats to reveal the hiding-place of the unfortunate couple in the vestry of the church, where those officers had placed them for better security. The Osbornes were then stripped, and, with their hands tied to their toes, were thrown into Longmarstone pool. After much ducking and ill-usage the old woman was thrown upon the bank, quite naked and almost choked with mud, and she died in a few minutes. Her dead body was tied to her husband, who was alleged to have died shortly afterwards from the cruel treatment he received, but who ultimately recovered, though he was unable to give evidence at the trial.

Aftermath
The authorities determined to overawe local sympathy with the rioters, and to make a salutary example. At the coroner's inquest the jury brought in a verdict of wilful murder against one Thomas Colley, a chimney sweep, and against twenty-one other known and unknown persons. Colley had taken a leading part in the outrage, and had collected money from the rabble for 'the sport he had shown them in ducking the old witch.' He was tried at Hertford assizes on 30 July 1751, before Sir Thomas Lee, and his plea that he went into the pond as a friend to try and save Mrs. Osborne being unsupported by evidence, he was found guilty and sentenced to death. He was escorted from Hertford gaol to St. Albans by two troops of horseguards blue, and the next morning, 24 Aug., was executed at Gubblecut Cross in Tring, and afterwards hanged in chains on the same gallows. 'The infatuation of the greatest part of the country people was so great that they would not be spectators of his death; yet many thousands stood at a distance to see him go, grumbling and muttering that it was a hard case to hang a man for destroying an old wicked woman that had done so much harm by her witchcraft.'

It is noticeable that the last case of a witch being condemned by the verdict of an English jury, that of Jane Wenham, also occurred in Hertfordshire in 1712.

Notes

References
Wright's Narratives of Sorcery and Magic, 1851, ii. 327
Gent. Map. 1751, passim
Universal Magazine, August 1751
Knapp and Baldwin's Newgate Calendar, 1825, ii. 117
Pike's History of Crime; Tyburn Chronicle, iv. 22 (with an illustration engraved by Rennoldson after Wale)
Chambers's Book of Days, ii. 250; Remarkable Confession and Last Dying Words of Thomas Colley (containing a curious 'representation of the manner in which the infatuated mob cruelly murdered Ruth Osborne,' in three woodcuts)
Trial of Thomas Colley, to which is annexed some further Particulars of the Affair from the Mouth of John Osborne.

Attribution

1680 births
1751 deaths
People from Dacorum (district)
People accused of witchcraft
Witchcraft in England